Haleyville City School District  is a school district in Winston County, Alabama.

External links
 

School districts in Alabama